I Will Be is the debut album by Dum Dum Girls, released on March 30, 2010. The first pressing by HoZac Records was released as a 12" vinyl LP with a black-and-white version of the current album art. After the band signed to Sub Pop, the album was rereleased later in 2010 on both CD and 12" vinyl with the full colored cover.

Three singles were issued from I Will Be: "Jail La La", released by Sub Pop as a 7" single on February 16, 2010; "Bhang Bhang, I'm a Burnout", released as a 7" single on November 23, 2010 by Slumberland Records; and "It Only Takes One Night", released by Sub Pop as a promo-only CD-R.

Reception

The album received generally positive reviews upon its release. At Metacritic, which assigns a normalized rating out of 100 to reviews from mainstream critics, the album received an average score of 79, based on 23 reviews, which indicates "Generally favorable reviews".

Legacy
Reflecting on it 10 years later, Stereogums James Rettig dubbed I Will Be "a precursor to the summer of 2010's big trend" that included "sunny harmonies and fuzzy distortion" and bands like Best Coast and Wavves. He felt it "worth holding up as an exemplar" of its era's music due to how well it still stood up.

In popular culture
"It Only Takes One Night" was featured on the soundtrack of the 2010 EA Sports video game FIFA 11, while "Bhang Bhang, I'm a Burnout" was featured on the soundtrack of the 2011 Atari video game Test Drive Unlimited 2.

Track listing

Personnel
 Dee Dee  – vocals, guitar, bass, drum programming
 Richard Gottehrer – producer
 Alonzo Vargas – mixing

Release history

The first 200 copies of the LP version of the album were released on gold vinyl on HoZac Records. An undisclosed number of Sub Pop vinyls were released on blood red and black marbled vinyl.

References

External links
Dum Dum Girls' MySpace
Dum Dum Girls on Subpop

2010 albums
Dum Dum Girls albums